Pierre-Louis Loubet (born 18 February 1997) is a French rally driver. He is the 2019 World Rally Championship 2 Champion. He is the son of the 1989 European Rally Champion Yves Loubet.

Career

Early career 
Loubet started karting at 7 years old at the Figari circuit, close to his Porto-Vecchio family residence. After a year of Formula Renault in 2014, he switches to rallying after obtaining his drivers license.

Beginnings in rallying (2015) 
Loubet made his entry into world rallying in the JWRC category in Portugal, where he would finish 2nd in his category with Victor Belotto as a co-driver. After retirements in Finland and Poland, he started the 2015 Tour de Corse with new co-driver Vincent Landais, but would also retire from the rally. He would finish the year with a 5th place in Catalunya and 4th in Wales. He would finish the year 6th overall in the 2015 Junior World Rally Championship.

Initial WRC2 Campaign (2016) 
Pierre-Louis started the 2016 WRC-2 campaign on a Peugeot 207 S2000 in Portugal with a retirement, before switching to a Citroën DS3 R5 run by PH Sport. He would then go on to score several points finishes in Sardinia, Poland and Corsica in WRC2, before scoring a podium in Catalunya in the RC2 category.

M-Sport (2017) 
Starting the year with PH Sport in Sweden, he retired due to an engine failure and duly switched to M-Sport and the Ford Fiesta R5, alongside Eric Camilli and Teemu Suninen before Corsica. This would be marked as a consistent year with many points finishes (4th in Catalunya being the best result), but with no podiums.

Hyundai / BRC Racing Team (2018) 
Hoping to take a step up in 2018, Loubet switched to the new Hyundai i20 R5, driving for BRC Racing Team. He started the year with a limited FIA ERC campaign in the Azores and Canary Islands, both of which were impacted by mechanical and electronical failures, but with a decent pace to show for it. After more issues in Corsica, he would finish a season-best 4th in Portugal, with retirements being the theme of the season in Italy, Germany and Wales.

First title (2019) 
Loubet started 2019 as he had done in 2018 with a two-event European Rally Championship campaign, again in the Azores and Canary Islands. He would have to retire before the final stage with an alternator belt failure, despite being on the podium. In the Canary Islands, a false start penalty would demote him from 3rd to 5th place, but the pace shown in the Skoda was promising. He arrived to Corsica hoping to take a good result at his rally, but small issues would hinder his pace, and he would finish 10th in class. Starting with Portugal however, he went on a consistent and quick pace to win Portugal and Sardinia. He would then go on to finish 4th in Finland. After the summer break, he battled it out with Petter Solberg at Wales Rally GB, finishing 2nd and taking the championship lead. He would then finish 4th in Catalunya, narrowly missing out on clinching the title. The decision had been made to enter Rally Australia for a final round showdown against Benito Guerra, however, following the widespread bushfires in New South Wales, the rally would be cancelled, crowning Loubet as champion with a 3-point advantage over Kajetan Kajetanowicz.

Rally results

WRC results
 
* Season still in progress.

WRC-2 results

References

External links

Pierre-Louis Loubet's e-wrc profile

1997 births
Living people
European Rally Championship drivers
French racing drivers
French rally drivers
World Rally Championship drivers
M-Sport drivers